You're Beautiful is a 2009 South Korean television series starring Jang Keun-suk, Park Shin-hye, Jung Yong-hwa of CNBLUE, and Lee Hong-gi of F.T. Island. The series follows fictional musician band, A.N.JELL, and how the relationship between its members changes when a girl posing as her twin brother joins the band. It aired on SBS from October 7 to November 26, 2009, for 16 episodes.

Synopsis
Ko Mi-nyeo (Park Shin-hye) has lived at an orphanage with her twin brother, Ko Mi-nam, since childhood after their father died. Years later, Mi-nam becomes a music idol and Mi-nyeo lives in a junior nun dorm to fulfill her dream of becoming a nun. One day, Mi-nam successfully auditions for and wins the "A.N Entertainment" vocal auditions to join the musical band A.N.Jell. However, he must leave for the United States in order to correct his botched plastic surgery. Mi-nam's manager, Ma Hoon-yi (Kim In-kwon) approaches Mi-nyeo and requests her to pose as Mi-nam for a month till he recovers. Mi-nyeo is against it at first, but eventually agrees, as a path to fame would give the twins an opportunity to find their mother. Thus, Mi-nyeo poses as her brother and joins the band A.N.Jell, where she meets its members: the arrogant Hwang Tae-kyung (Jang Keun-suk), the gentle Kang Shin-woo (Jung Yong-hwa) and the bubbly Jeremy (Lee Hong-gi).

At first, Tae-kyung is against Mi-nam's addition and makes her life hard, while Shin-woo and Jeremy are friendly to her. Eventually, Tae-kyung discovers that Mi-nam is a girl and threatens to reveal it, but Mi-nam manages to win him over. Through their interactions, Tae-kyung began to develop feelings for Mi-nam. Shin-woo and Jeremy also developed feelings for her, even though the latter thinks that Mi-nam is a boy. As Mi-nyeo struggles to hide her secret from the media while performing with A.N.JELL, she discovers her mother's past, which is somehow connected with Tae-kyung.

Cast

Main

 Jang Keun-suk as Hwang Tae-kyung
Lead vocalist and guitarist of A.N.JELL. Tae-kyung harbours a cold exterior but grows softer as he began to fall for Mi-nyeo. He is troubled by his past, and his distanced relationship with his mother.

 Park Shin-hye as Ko Mi-nyeo / Gemma (female) and Ko Mi-nam (male; Oh Hee-joon plays Mi-nam's body double in Ep. 15) 
A sweet and naive girl who aspires to become a nun. She is cajoled by her twin brother’s manager to disguise herself as her twin in order to help keep his place in the band A.N.JELL, and to search for their mother. At first, the deception is to last for a day, but circumstances result in it being prolonged.

 Jung Yong-hwa as Kang Shin-woo
Bassist, rapper and keyboardist of A.N.JELL. Shin-woo is the first to discover Mi-nyeo's female identity, though he does not reveal this to anyone, including Mi-nyeo. Warm and gentle, he acts as Mi-nyeo's guardian but soon develops feelings for her.

Lee Hong-gi as Jeremy
Vocalist and drummer of A.N.JELL. Bright and optimistic, Jeremy tends to be oblivious of things around him. He begins to develop feelings for Mi-nyeo, and questions his sexuality because of it.

Supporting
 Uee as Yoo He-yi
A two-faced actress who later falls for Tae-kyung. She soon learns Mi-nyeo’s secret and tries to use it against her.

 Kim In-kwon as Ma Hoon-yi
Mi-nam's manager.

 Kim Sung-ryung as Mo Hwa-ran
Famous actress and solo singer. She is Hwang Tae-kyung's "hidden" mother who abandoned him to be with her lover, also Mi-nyeo's father.

 Jung Chan as Ahn Seong-chang
President of talent agency A.N Entertainment.

 Choi Soo-eun as "Coordi" Wang
Stylist of A.N.JELL.

 Bae Geu-rin as Sa Yu-ri
A.N.JELL fan club president.

 Choi Ran as Go Mi-ja
Mi-nam and Mi-nyeo's aunt.

 Jang Won-young as Kim Young-ho
Photographer of Nara Daily News.

 Kim Dong-yeon as Kim Dong-jun 
Mi-nam's high school friend who has a crush on Mi-nyeo, an extra in "Mi-nam"'s music video.

 Tae Hwang as assistant 
 Kim Min-chan as backup dancer
 Seong Byeong-suk as head nun 
 Jeon Hye-yeong A.N.JELL fanclub member
 Kim Min-young as A.N.JELL fanclub member
 Kim Young-hoon

Special appearances
 Lee Jooyeon & Yoo So-young as girl group "Before School"
 Yoo Seung-ho as convenience store customer (Ep. 9)
 Oh Hee-joon as Ko Mi-nam (Ep. 15)

Soundtrack

Part 1

Production
Jang Keun-suk and Park Shin-hye were both cast first, with director Hong Sung-chang stating that the two were well-suited to convey the "fresh" idol stars concept he wanted. Lee Hong-gi (a singer with the idol group F.T. Island) had been a child actor, and this was his acting comeback after a five-year break (his last acting project being Kkangsoon in 2005). Jung Yong-hwa made his acting debut with this role, which he auditioned for whilst preparing to debut with his band CNBLUE in Japan.

Reception

Cultural impact 
During its run, several car companies offered to have their cars be used on the drama for promotional purposes. The latest car from the German automaker Audi introduced their Audi S4 on the miniseries, with Jang Keun-suk driving it.

Although the drama achieved mediocre ratings for broadcast, it managed to gain a cult following with many fans watching the drama online.

Due to the popularity of the show, the soundtrack album of the miniseries sold 20,000 copies within its first seven days of release. The album became a top seller on various music sites, such as MelOn, Dosirak, and Mnet. At the end of 2011, the album amassed a total of 57,000 copies in South Korea. The album was written and produced by Han Sung-ho, who also worked on the dramas Lovers, On Air, and Brilliant Legacy.

Because the drama features a concert footage of A.N.JELL in it, the cast members actually performed a mini-concert, where it was reported that as many 25,000 fans showed up. The group performed the songs "Promise" and "Still". Jang Keun-suk also sang "Good Bye" and "What Should I Do", the latter is the track Tae-kyung remakes for his mother in the drama. Park Shin-hye sang her character's theme song, "Lovely Day".

The series was also broadcast throughout Asia. It aired on channels such as Fuji TV in Japan, CCTV in China, BBTV in Thailand, 8TV in Malaysia on 2010, Channel U in Singapore, Indosiar in Indonesia, Mbc4 in UAE and ABS-CBN in Philippines When the series was broadcast in Japan on Fuji TV, it scored very high ratings beating out all of its competitors in its timeslot. The series became so popular in Japan it is believed to have overtaken the popularity of Winter Sonata, another popular Korean drama in Japan.

Awards and nominations

Viewership

Source: TNmS Media Korea, AGB Nielsen Korea

Remake
A Japanese remake of this drama aired in Japan in 2011 with the title Ikemen desu ne, and included a cameo appearance by Jang Keun-suk in episode 8 as himself. A Taiwanese remake, Fabulous Boys was broadcast in 2013, which included a cameo by Park Shin-hye in the first episode as Go Mi-nyeo.

References

External links
 You're Beautiful official SBS website 
 
 

Seoul Broadcasting System television dramas
2009 South Korean television series debuts
2009 South Korean television series endings
Korean-language television shows
South Korean musical television series
South Korean romantic comedy television series
South Korean television series remade in other languages
Television shows written by the Hong sisters
Television series by Bon Factory Worldwide